Himmatwala is a 1998 Indian Hindi-language action film directed by Jayant Gilatar, starring Mithun Chakraborty and Ayesha Jhulka. Other important roles were portrayed by Shakti Kapoor, Dina Pathak, Tiku Talsania and Tinnu Anand. The film introduces Rajesh Sharma and Radhika.

Synopsis

Kishan (Mithun Chakraborty) lives a happy life with his wife (Ayesha Jhulka) and sister Kiran (Radhika) in a quaint village. When Kishan finds out that his sister has fallen in love with the head of the village, Chandra Prakash's (Shakti Kapoor) brother Suraj (Mukul Dev), he goes to Chandra Prakash's house with his sisters proposal. 
This makes Chandra Prakash really angry and he throws Kishan out of his house after humiliating and belittling him.

Suraj arrives to tell Kishan he will marry Kiran, come hell or high water and with or without his brothers permission. As Kiran and Suraj are getting married, Chandra Prakash arrives and murder's both Kiran and Suraj in front of everyone.

Kishan is struck on the head which causes him to lose his sanity and he returns to a mental age of 7.

When another eloped couple Raja (Rajiv Verma) and Kajal (Keerthi Chawla), who is a lookalike of his sister Kiran, come to him for help, he helps them and in turn regains his sanity. Will he be able to reunite Kajal with her lover, which he failed to do with his sister??

Cast
 Mithun Chakraborty as Kishan
 Ayesha Jhulka as Radha
 Shakti Kapoor as Chandra Prakash Kanyal
 Mukul Dev as Suraj
 Keerthi Chawla as Kiran/ Kajal (Dual Role) 
 Reema Lagoo as aunt of Raja
 Tiku Talsania as Bakra
 Tinnu Anand as Banki
 Rajeev Verma as Durgesh Maheshwari Kajal's Father
 Rajesh Sharma as Raja
 Dina Pathak as grandmother Kajal
 Beena Banerjee as Kajal's Mother
 Amitesh Koccher as Chintu Child Artist

Soundtrack

References

External links
 

1998 films
1990s Hindi-language films
Mithun's Dream Factory films
Films shot in Ooty
Indian action films